Space Megaforce, known in Japan and Europe as , is a vertically scrolling shoot 'em up video game developed by Compile. It was published by Toho in 1992 for the Super Nintendo Entertainment System as part of the Aleste series. In a traditional fashion, the player pilots a spaceship through a variety of locales crawling with enemy squadrons to shoot down, though the story in the Japanese version is different from the American and European one. Super Aleste also offers a "Short Game", featuring short segments of the regular levels, with the emphasis on scoring as many points as possible.

Story
The story differs slightly depending on which version is played, though the opening premise is always the same.

In the year 2048, a large mechanical sphere falls from space and starts attacking major cities around the world. After much destruction, the sphere hovers over the jungles of South America, drawing lines into the ground similar to the Nazca Line drawings as it expands itself and draws energy from the jungle foliage. Equipped with its own defense system, The Sphere destroys all attacks made on it by Earth's military. The original Aleste fighter ship's failure to stop the sphere's growth prompts the construction of a space fighter capable of wielding amazing weaponry, that fighter being the Super Aleste. Tasked with flying into and destroying the sphere, the Super Aleste must also destroy any reinforcements the sphere calls for which come from the deepest depths of space.

In the original Japanese story, the Super Aleste is piloted by an ace named Raz and his co-pilot is a mysterious young alien woman named Thi, a prisoner aboard the sphere who harnesses strange powers freed by the constant attacks against the sphere. Thi's role in the game is to fly with Raz into the sphere, weaken its defenses and properly wrest the sphere's power source. The presence of both characters, and thus the game's original ending, were cut from Space Megaforce and the European version of Super Aleste.

Gameplay
There are eight types of weapons to use, and each can be powered up by collecting chips (small egg-shaped items). Picking up chips causes the player's current weapon to level-up, to a maximum of six. There are two types of chips to find; Orange chips contribute to a level-up, but at higher levels, more chips are required to reach the next level. Green chips make the weapon level up instantly. Each weapon has a function that can be manipulated with the Shot-Control button, changing around the weapon's abilities to suit different situations. Switching to another weapon is done by picking up a numbered item, with initials representing one of the eight weapons.

The player's health is tied to the level of their weapon. When the ship is hit, the weapon loses four levels of power (but it cannot go below 0). If the weapon is already at level 0 upon getting hit, the player dies. This means the weapon must be at level 5 or 6 for the ship to survive two hits. Also, there are two types of extra lives; normally, if the player dies, they try the level again at the last checkpoint. However, it is possible to convert lives into Special Lives with a certain power-up; these allow the player to come back at the exact place they were killed, losing no progress. If the player has enough lives that a number is used to display them, then the icon becomes red if they have at least one Special Life left.

The player's ship cannot be directly harmed by on-screen background structures, but will be crushed if caught between an edge of the screen and an object scrolling towards that edge.

Version differences
The Japanese version has more content than the European and American versions:
It has super deformed art on the options and game over screen.
The ending is twice as long and reveals the mystery behind the enemy invasion. More information is revealed upon beating the game on the harder, very hard, and then the hardest difficulty levels.
The names of the levels and their bosses are different.
Some voice samples are different.

Reception

In episode 3 of season 1, British television show Bad Influence! reviewed Super Aleste and scored it 10 out of 10 stars.

In 1997, Electronic Gaming Monthly ranked it the 46th best console video game of all time, citing its ingenuous power-ups and usage of the Super NES's 'mode 7' graphical features to present differing level styles.

Adaptation
A manga based on the game and written by Kubo Muneo, was published by 'Monthly ASCII Comic' and released on February 22, 1993 in Japan.

See also
Naoyuki Kato, Super Aleste illustrator

References

External links
Super Aleste review on SHMUPS! (Archived from the original on 2007-08-16. Retrieved 2016-06-22.)

Space Megaforce/Super Aleste at Giant Bomb

1992 video games
Compile (company) games
Vertically scrolling shooters
Super Nintendo Entertainment System games
Super Nintendo Entertainment System-only games
Toho
Video games developed in Japan
Video games set in the 2040s
Single-player video games